Cent may refer to:

Currency
 Cent (currency), a one-hundredth subdivision of several units of currency
 Penny (Canadian coin), a Canadian coin removed from circulation in 2013
 1 cent (Dutch coin), a Dutch coin minted between 1941 and 1944
 1 cent euro coin, a European coin
 Penny (United States coin), a United States coin

Locations
 Cents, Luxembourg, a quarter of Luxembourg City, Luxembourg
 Cent, the Old English term for modern-day Kent, England

Measurement
Cent (music), a logarithmic measure of relative pitch or intervals
Specifically, it can refer to:
a unit of nuclear reactivity; see Dollar (reactivity)

See also
 Century, 100 consecutive years
 Percent, 1 in 100
 Cent sign